Municipal and local elections were held for the first time in Costa Rica on 1 December 2002. This was the first time citizens of the 81 cantons were able to directly choose their mayors as previously the municipal executive was appointed by the city council. A syndic and 4 District Councilors were also elected for each canton’s district as 8 intendants for especial districts with administrative autonomy.

Then ruling Social Christian Unity Party had its best results in history on a local election gaining most of the mayors and councilors; 48 mayors and 785 syndics and councilors. National Liberation Party, then main opposition force, earn the second largest number of both with 27 mayors and 676. Costa Rica was still pretty much under a two-party system at the time even when in the recent general election the new force Citizens Action Party surprised with high voting for president and parliament, in this first municipal running achieve only one mayor in Montes de Oca (the party’s hometown).

Results

Mayor

By province

Syndics and district councils

See also 
 Local government in Costa Rica
 List of mayors in Costa Rica

References

2002 elections in Central America
2002 in Costa Rica
Local elections in Costa Rica